Sgt. Alexander Albert Drabik (December 28, 1910 – September 28, 1993) was the first American soldier to cross the Ludendorff Bridge over the Rhine river at Remagen, Germany in World War II during the Battle of Remagen. He led two other enlisted men across the bridge, running  while under fire, knowing that the demolition charges attached to the bridge could be detonated at any moment. He was awarded the Distinguished Service Cross for his action.

Biography

Drabik was the son of John D. and Frances (née Lewandowski) Drabik, Polish immigrants from Szymborze, Germany, now Poland. They raised thirteen children on a farm near Holland and Toledo, Ohio. Alex, youngest son of 14 children, attended Dorr  Street School. He enlisted in the United States Army in October 1942. Prior to his enlistment, he worked as a butcher in Holland, Ohio.

Military career 

Early in his military career, he distinguished himself by rescuing 120 recruits who had become lost in the California desert.  Drabik was seriously wounded during the Battle of the Bulge.

Squad leader Drabik, part of Able Company, 27th Armored Infantry Battalion, Combat Command B, 9th Armored Division received orders from Company commander, Lt. Karl H. Timmermann to assault the Ludendorff Bridge near Remagen on March 7, 1945, in an effort to seize and hold it.

Under heavy machine-gun fire, Drabik dashed across the bridge while Germans tried desperately to detonate it. He lost his helmet on the way. Drabik was the first American soldier to reach the east side of the bridge. For his heroism, Drabik was awarded the Distinguished Service Cross. U.S. Representative Marcy Kaptur (D-OH) has repeatedly sponsored legislation to award him the Medal of Honor.

Drabik later said:

 On August 18, 1945, Toledo honored him and his commanding officer, Maj. Gen. John W. Leonard, with a parade.

Decorations

Death 

Drabik was killed in an auto accident in 1993, en route to a reunion of his unit.

In media
The book  mentions Drabik.

Drabik is referenced in a Hollywood film inspired by a book written about its capture, The Bridge at Remagen, was made in 1969. The actor George Segal played the character Lieutenant Phil Hartman, based on Lt. Timmermann. Ben Gazzara as Sergeant Angelo was based on Sgt. Alexander A. Drabik the first soldier across the bridge.

References

1910 births
1993 deaths
United States Army soldiers
American people of Polish descent
United States Army personnel of World War II
Recipients of the Distinguished Service Cross (United States)
Road incident deaths in Missouri
People from Holland, Ohio
United States Army non-commissioned officers